Charles John Boyle (c. 1877 – April 21, 1947) was an American football player and coach. Boyle grew up in Worcester, Massachusetts and played college football at Dartmouth College from 1896 to 1900 before graduating in 1901.  He was an assistant football coach at Dartmouth for a couple years and was the head football coach at Ohio Wesleyan from 1901 to 1902 and Western Reserve University in Cleveland, Ohio in 1903.

Head coaching record

Football

References

Year of birth missing
1947 deaths
19th-century players of American football
Case Western Spartans football coaches
Dartmouth Big Green football coaches 
Dartmouth Big Green football players
Ohio Wesleyan Battling Bishops football coaches